Ipepo Lo Hlanga was an early Zulu language newspaper. It was published from Pietermaritzburg in Natal from 1894 to April 1904. Among its contributors was Magema Magwaza Fuze.

References 

Zulu-language mass media
Defunct newspapers published in South Africa
Publications established in 1894
Publications disestablished in 1904